The 2012 Philippine Basketball Association (PBA) Commissioner's Cup was the second conference of the 2011–12 PBA season. The tournament began on February 10 and ended on May 6, 2012. The tournament is an import-laden format, which means that a team may sign an import or a pure-foreign player for each team with no height limit.

Format
The following format was observed for the duration of the conference:
 Single-round robin eliminations; 9 games per team; Teams are then seeded by basis on win–loss records. In case of tie, playoffs will be held only for the #2 and #6 seeds.
 The top two teams after the elimination round will automatically advance to the semifinals.
 The next four teams will play in a best of three quarterfinals series for the two last berths in the semifinals. Matchups are:
 QF1: #3 team vs. #6 team
 QF2: #4 team vs. #5 team
 The winners of the quarterfinals will challenge the top two teams in a best-of-five semifinals series. Matchups are:
 SF1: #1 vs. QF2
 SF2: #2 vs. QF1
The winners in the semifinals advance to the best of seven Finals.

Elimination round

Team standings

Schedule

Results

Sixth seed playoff

Second seed playoff

Bracket

Quarterfinals

(3) B-Meg vs. (6) Meralco

(4) Alaska vs. (5) Barako Bull series

Semifinals

(1) Talk 'N Text vs. (5) Barako Bull

(2) Barangay Ginebra vs. (3) B-Meg

Finals

Imports 
The following is the list of imports, which had played for their respective teams at least once, with the returning imports in italics. Highlighted are the imports who stayed with their respective teams for the whole conference.

Awards

Conference
Best Player of the Conference: Mark Caguioa (Barangay Ginebra)
Best Import of the Conference: Denzel Bowles (B-Meg)
Finals MVP: James Yap (B-Meg)

Players of the Week

Statistical leaders

Locals

References

External links
 PBA.ph

PBA Commissioner's Cup
Commissioner's Cup